African Americans in Florida or Black Floridians are residents of the state of Florida who are of African ancestry. As of the 2010 U.S. Census, African Americans were 16.6% of the state's population. The African-American presence in the peninsula extends as far back as the early 18th century, when African-American slaves escaped from slavery in Georgia into the swamps of the peninsula. Black slaves were brought to Florida by Spanish conquistadors.

History 

The history of African Americans in Florida can be divided into several eras, the dates varying by location: 1) Slavery until 1865. A few slaves had been freed, but were never free from the threat of being again enslaved. 2) Reconstruction after the American Civil War. 3) Remainder of 19th century. 4) Terrorist activity against African Americans. 5) Civil Rights Era. 5) Late 20th-21st century.

The history of Black people in Florida, however, dates back to the pre-American period, beginning with the arrival of Congolese-Spanish conquistador Juan Garrido in 1513, the enslaved Afro-Spanish explorer Estevanico in 1528, and the landing of free and African enslaved persons at Mission Nombre de Dios in the future St. Augustine, Florida in 1565.

The first Black city in the state came in the latter region, when a military outpost of free Black settlers was established at Fort Mose when the Black population became numerous in St Augustine. The uptick was largely due to fugitive slaves from British colonies in North America to Spanish Florida where they were promised freedom in exchange for military service and conversion to Catholicism.

Florida was later acquired by the British, bringing the First Spanish Period to an end and the departure of the Spanish population (including blacks) to Cuba. African-American slaves soon became the main Black population in the state. The Spanish regained Florida briefly in 1784 before departing for good in 1821.

After the Civil War, there was a brief Reconstruction era from 1867 to 1877. This included enforcement of rights for African Americans. This era vanished suddenly, the result of the Compromise of 1877.

Post-reconstruction policies allowed civil rights for blacks to lapse. Black voters and black politicians vanished under threats from reactionary whites.

Per capita lynching was highest in Florida than any other state from 1900 to 1930. Offenders were often known, but no legal proceedings ensued. A tipping point was reached in 1951, with the Murder of Harry and Harriette Moore. FBI help was sought. The KKK was suspected, but there was insufficient evidence for trial. A violent era was followed by continued segregation.

Governor LeRoy Collins took the position that segregation was morally unfair and wrong. This was succeeded by Federal Civil Rights Act in 1964. Schools were integrated, but not without difficulty.

There was a Afro-Cuban community in Tampa and Ybor City in the 1880s. Afro-Cubans were segregated from white Cubans and separated from African Americans by language, culture, and religion. Afro-Cubans were discriminated in Florida due to their skin color.

Population 
As of 2010, those of African ancestry accounted for 16.0% of Florida's population, which includes African Americans. Out of the 16.0%, 4.0% (741,879) were West Indian or Afro-Caribbean American. During the early 1900s, black people made up nearly half of the state's population. In response to segregation, disfranchisement and agricultural depression, many African Americans migrated from Florida to northern cities in the Great Migration, in waves from 1910 to 1940, and again starting in the later 1940s. They moved for jobs, better education for their children and the chance to vote and participate in society. By 1960, the proportion of African Americans in the state had declined to 18%. Conversely, large numbers of northern whites moved to the state. Today, large concentrations of black residents can be found in northern and central Florida. Aside from blacks descended from African slaves brought to the southern U.S., there are also large numbers of blacks of West Indian, recent African, and Afro-Latino immigrant origins, especially in the Miami/South Florida area.

Notable people

James Weldon Johnson (1871–1938)
Mary McLeod Bethune (1875–1955)
Frank B. Butler (1885-1973) 
Zora Neale Hurston (1891–1960)
Augusta Savage (1892–1962)
Thelma "Butterfly" McQueen (1911–1995)
Sidney Poitier (1927-2022)
George "Buster" Cooper (1929–2016)
Peggy Quince (born in 1941)
Angela Bassett (born in 1958)
Emmitt Smith (born in 1969)
Maya Rudolph (born in 1972)
Andrew Gillum (born in 1979) 
Barry Jenkins (born in 1979)
Eric Darius (born in 1982)
Antonio Brown (born in 1988)
Denzel Curry (born in 1995)
Trayvon Martin (1995-2012)
Trick Daddy (Born 1974)
Flo Rida (born 1979)
T-Pain (born 1984)
Rick Ross (born 1976)
Kodak Black (born 1997)

See also

 African Americans in Georgia (U.S. state)
 Black Seminoles
 African-American officeholders during and following the Reconstruction era
 History of slavery in Florida
 List of African-American historic places in Florida
 Negro Fort
 Gullah
 Demographics of Florida
 History of African Americans in Jacksonville, Florida
 Afro-Cubans
 Hispanics and Latinos in Florida
 Indigenous peoples of Florida
 List of African-American newspapers in Florida
Black Southerners
History of Florida

External links 

 Carol E. Mundy Collection - RICHES Mosaic Interface
 Florida's African-American History Trail
 The 1526 Project: Horrors in Florida's Black History You Didn't Learn in School
 Slavery took hold in Florida under the Spanish in the 'forgotten century' of 1492-1619. | Column
 AFRO-CUBANS IN TAMPA
 African Presence in Florida
https://www.floridamemory.com/learn/exhibits/photo_exhibits/black_history/&ved=2ahUKEwj-y9zf4qz6AhUXgP0HHc2hBKcQFnoECCsQAQ&usg=AOvVaw3O1Nmdqj6BVOtlYDhbrL8q
 African Americans in Florida
 Black Society in Spanish Florida
 Black Miami in the Twentieth Century
RACISM AND THE STRUGGLE FOR CIVIL RIGHTS IN FLORIDA

References